The World Series of Blackjack is a televised blackjack tournament created and produced by the cable network GSN.  It is a closed tournament; players are either invited to play or attempt to win a spot via a satellite tournament.  Rounds are edited into 1-hour episodes and broadcast on GSN. Matt Vasgersian and Max Rubin provided commentary for the first two seasons. Tiki Arsenault was the dealer for Season 1 as Deanna Bacon was the dealer for Seasons 2 and 3 while Jessica Knight was the dealer for Season 4.

Season 1 premiered weekly from March 15, 2004 to April 26, 2004 with a co-host, Melana Scantlin.

Season 2 premiered weekly from January 21, 2005 to April 22, 2005 with a new co-host, Megan Riordan.

Season 3 premiered weekly from June 5, 2006 to September 4, 2006 as part of GSN's Casino Night (retooled, with High Stakes Poker, as Vegas Night) programming block, with new hosts John Fugelsang and Ben Mezrich.

Season 4 premiered on GSN from June 4, 2007 to August 27, 2007. A field of 40 players, including Celebrity Blackjack champion Caroline Rhea, baseball star Orel Hershiser and magician Penn Jillette competed for a $1 million prize pool. Vasgersian returned as a commentator.

Rules

The rules (as of season 4) are as follows:

Each player begins with $100,000 in chips ($10,000 in chips in Season 1).
The initial minimum bet is $1,000, the maximum bet is $50,000 (minimum bet is $100, the max bet is $5,000 in Season 1).
There are six decks.
Each player gets one "Burger King Power Chip" per round, which allows a player to switch one card with the next card in the shoe. If used on a double-down hand, the player may look at the double-down card and replace it if desired. The power chip was added as of season three.
There are two "knockout cards" in the shoe. Once a knockout card is drawn, the player with the lowest amount of chips after the next hand is eliminated. After the first knockout card, the minimum bet increases to $2,500, after the second, the bet increases to $5,000. The deck is shuffled after each knockout card. If there are only four players when the first is drawn and three when the second is drawn, no players are eliminated, but the minimum bet still increases. The knockout cards also appeared first in season three.
Players can split, double-down, and insure for less than their bet. 
Players can double-down on anything.
Surrendering the hand is legal, which allows players to give up half their bet and concede the hand.
If a player can't make the minimum bet, they are eliminated.
Blackjack pays 3 to 2, dealer must stand on all 17s and higher (including soft hands).
After 30 hands in Season 1, the player with the most chips wins.
After 25 hands in Season 2-4, the player with the most chips wins.

Season 1 results
The World Series of Blackjack Tournament was held at Mohegan Sun Casino & Resort in Connecticut. First place will win $10,000 and move on to the Final table while Second place will win $5,000 and move on to the Wild Card table. The winner of the Wild Card table will move on to the final table. First place at the final table will win $100,000 USD grand prize.

Mike Aponte, a former member of the MIT Blackjack Team, won the Season 1 championship and $100,000.

Season 2 results
The World Series of Blackjack Tournament was held at Golden Nugget Hotel & Casino in Las Vegas. The first place will move on to the Semi-Final table while the Second place will move on to the Wild Card table. The winner of the Wild Card table will move on to the Semi-Final table. The top two finishers in the Semi-Final table will move on to the final table for a chance at winning a $250,000 USD grand prize. First place at the final table will win a $250,000 USD grand prize.

Ken Einiger claimed the Season 2 championship, winning $250,000.

Season 3 results
The World Series of Blackjack Tournament was held at Hilton Hotel & Casino in Las Vegas. The first place will move on to the Semi-Final table while the Second place will move on to the Wild Card table. The winner of the Wild Card table will move on to the Semi-Final table. The top two finishers in the Semi-Final table will move on to the Final Table for a chance at winning a $500,000 USD grand prize. First place at the final table will win a $500,000 USD grand prize.

Dr. Jeff Bernstein claimed the Season 3 championship, winning the $500,000 grand prize.

1Qualified for Wild Card Round through random drawing among all 3rd-5th place preliminary finishers.
2Qualified for Final Table through random drawing among all 3rd-5th place semi-final finishers.

Season 4 results
The World Series of Blackjack Tournament was held at Hilton Hotel & Casino in Las Vegas. The first place will move on to the Semi-Final table while the Second place will move on to the Wild Card table. The winner of the Wild Card table will move on to the Semi-Final table. The top two finishers in the Semi-Final table will move on to the final table for a chance at winning a $500,000 USD grand prize. First place at the final table will win a $500,000 USD grand prize.

Alice Walker (who had previously won GSN's million-dollar Three card poker championship) took first place and $500,000.
1Qualified for Wild Card Round through random drawing among all 3rd-5th place preliminary finishers.
2Qualified for final table through random drawing among all 3rd-5th places semi-final finishers

See also
Celebrity Blackjack
World Blackjack Tour
Ultimate Blackjack Tour

References
AOL Blackjack
WSOB Information
TV.com summary
Blackjack Hero summary

External links
 

Television shows about blackjack
Game Show Network original programming
2004 American television series debuts